The 1997 NCAA Division II men's basketball tournament was the 41st annual single-elimination tournament to determine the national champion of men's NCAA Division II college basketball in the United States.

The tournament officially culminated the 1996–97 NCAA Division II men's basketball season, featuring forty-eight teams from around the country.

The national quarterfinals (Elite Eight), semifinals, and championship were played at the Commonwealth Convention Center in Louisville, Kentucky.

Cal State Bakersfield (29–4) defeated Northern Kentucky in the final, 57–56, to win their third overall Division II national championship and their third in five seasons.

It was also NKU's second consecutive loss in the national championship game, having lost to Fort Hays State in 1996.

Despite being the defending national champions with only one loss on the season, Fort Hays State had to travel from Kansas to South Dakota for the North Central Regional hosted by 4 loss South Dakota State.

The CSB Roadrunners were coached by Pat Douglass. Bakersfield's Kebu Stewart was the Most Outstanding Player.

Regionals

South - Huntsville, Alabama 
Location: Elmore Coliseum Host: Alabama A&M University

North Central - Brookings, South Dakota 
Location: Frost Arena Host: South Dakota State

Great Lakes - Indianapolis, Indiana 
Location: Nicoson Hall Host: University of Indianapolis

South Central - Edmond, Oklahoma 
Location: Hamilton Field House Host: University of Central Oklahoma

South Atlantic - Durham, North Carolina 
Location: McDougald–McLendon Arena Host: North Carolina Central University

East - Salem, West Virginia 
Location: T. Edward Davis Gymnasium Host: Salem-Teikyo University

Northeast - Manchester, New Hampshire 
Location: NHC Fieldhouse Host: New Hampshire College

West - Bakersfield, California 
Location: CSUB Student Activities Center Host: California State University, Bakersfield

Elite Eight-Louisville, Kentucky
Location: Commonwealth Convention Center Host: Bellarmine College

All-tournament team
 Kebu Stewart, Cal State Bakersfield (MOP)
 Cliff Clinton, Northern Kentucky
 Paul Cluxton, Northern Kentucky
 Shannon Minor, Northern Kentucky
 Terrance Springer, Salem-Teikyo

See also
1997 NCAA Division II women's basketball tournament
1997 NCAA Division I men's basketball tournament
1997 NCAA Division III men's basketball tournament
1997 NAIA Division I men's basketball tournament
1997 NAIA Division II men's basketball tournament

References
 NCAA Division II men's basketball tournament Results
 1997 NCAA Division II men's basketball tournament jonfmorse.com

NCAA Division II men's basketball tournament
Tournament
NCAA Division II basketball tournament
NCAA Division II basketball tournament